Fornelli is a comune (municipality) in the Province of Isernia in the Italian region Molise, located about  west of Campobasso and about  west of Isernia.

Annunziata D’Alesandro (née Lombardi), the mother of Nancy Pelosi, was born in Fornelli in 1909.

Sister cities
 Warwick, Rhode Island, United States

References

Cities and towns in Molise